Aleksandr Sergeyevich Nalivkin (18 March 1987 – 11 June 2013) was a Russian professional football player.

Club career
He played in the Russian Football National League for FC Nizhny Novgorod in 2009.

References

External links
 
 

1987 births
2013 deaths
Russian footballers
Association football forwards
FC Nizhny Novgorod (2007) players
FC Gornyak Uchaly players
Deaths from cancer in Russia